During the 2001–02 English football season, Nottingham Forest competed in the Football League First Division.

Season summary
The appointment of Paul Hart as manager failed to revitalise Forest and they dropped down to 16th in the final table, down from the previous season's 11th-place finish. Forest also had to contend with the departures of several key players, including highly rated young midfielder Jermaine Jenas to Newcastle United.

Final league table

Results
Nottingham Forest's score comes first

Legend

Football League First Division

FA Cup

League Cup

Squad

Left club during season

Reserve squad

Appearances

References

Nottingham Forest
2001-02